Deysi Grández Santillán (born 9 November 1985) is a Peruvian former footballer who played as a forward. She has been a member of the Peru women's national team.

International career
Grández capped for Peru at senior level during the 2003 South American Women's Football Championship.

References

External links

1985 births
Living people
Peruvian women's footballers
Peru women's international footballers
Women's association football forwards
21st-century Peruvian women